José Leonardo Montaña Arévalo (born 21 March 1992) is a male Colombian racewalker. He competed in the 20 kilometres walk event at the 2015 World Championships in Athletics in Beijing, China.

In 2021, he represented Colombia at the 2020 Summer Olympics and finished 11th in the men's 50 kilometres walk with a season best.

See also
 Colombia at the 2015 World Championships in Athletics

References

Place of birth missing (living people)
1992 births
Living people
Colombian male racewalkers
World Athletics Championships athletes for Colombia
Athletes (track and field) at the 2016 Summer Olympics
Olympic athletes of Colombia
Athletes (track and field) at the 2018 South American Games
South American Games silver medalists for Colombia
South American Games medalists in athletics
Athletes (track and field) at the 2019 Pan American Games
Pan American Games competitors for Colombia
Central American and Caribbean Games medalists in athletics
Athletes (track and field) at the 2020 Summer Olympics
Sportspeople from Bogotá
21st-century Colombian people